Are You My Mother? is a children's book by P. D. Eastman published by Random House Books for Young Readers on June 12, 1960, as part of its Beginner Books series.

Based on a 2007 online poll, the National Education Association listed the book as one of its "Teachers' Top 100 Books for Children." It was one of the "Top 100 Picture Books" of all time in a 2012 poll by School Library Journal.

Plot summary
Are You My Mother? is a story about a hatchling bird. His mother, thinking her egg will stay in her nest where she left it, leaves her egg alone and flies off to find food. The baby bird hatches while the mother is away. The hatchling does not understand where his mother is so he goes to look for her. While he cannot yet fly, he walks, and in his search, he asks a kitten (who did not hear a word the baby bird said because he says nothing), a hen, a dog, and a cow if they are his mother, but none of them are.

Refusing to give up, he does not walk, but runs as he sees an old car, which he realizes certainly cannot be his mother. In desperation, the hatchling calls out to a boat, and then a plane (but neither respond), and at last, he approaches and climbs onto the teeth of an enormous steam shovel calling to it "Mother, Mother! Here I am, Mother!". However, after it belches "SNORT" from its exhaust stack, the bird (thinking it’s a snort) cries "You are not my mother! You are a Snort!" As the machine shudders and grinds into motion, he cannot escape. "I want my mother!" he sobs.

At that moment, the steam shovel drops the hatchling into his nest, and his mother returns. The two are reunited, much to their delight, and the baby bird recounts to his mother the adventures he had looking for her.

Adaptations
The regular version has 64 pages. An abridged and simplified 24-page board book has also been published by Random House.

On August 13, 1991, Are You My Mother? was part of the Beginner Book Video series, directed and produced by Ray Messecar. The cast included Ardys Flavelle, Merwin Goldsmith, Marian Hailey, Ron Marshall, Brendon Parry and Jim Thurman.

ArtsPower National Touring Theatre created an hour-long musical performance based on the book geared for children grades K-2, with music by Richard DeRosa.

Critical reaction
The book's subjective appeal is derived from a compelling and compact plot full of humorous adventure, aided by line drawings that appeal to young children.

Based on a 2007 online poll, the National Education Association listed the book as one of its "Teachers' Top 100 Books for Children." It was one of the "Top 100 Picture Books" of all time in a 2012 poll by School Library Journal.

See also

Imprinting (psychology)

References

1960 children's books
American picture books
Books about birds
Books by P. D. Eastman
Random House books